The Night the Prowler (also known as Patrick White's The Night the Prowler) is a 1978 Australian film written by Patrick White, produced by Anthony Buckley and directed by Jim Sharman. Ruth Cracknell was nominated in 1979 for an AFI Award for Best Actress in a Lead Role for her part.

Cast
 Ruth Cracknell as Doris Bannister
 John Frawley as Humphrey Bannister
 Kerry Walker as Felicity Bannister
 John Derum as John
 Maggie Kirkpatrick as Madge Hopkirk
 Terry Camilleri as The Prowler
 Harry Neilson as Old man

Production
Sharman had worked successfully with White directing the latter's play The Season at Sarsaparilla. White suggested that his book The Night the Prowler might make a film; Sharman agreed and White wrote a screenplay.

The film was shot in November and December 1977.

Release
The film was selected to open the 1978 Sydney Film Festival and was harshly received.

Reception
Paul Byrnes of Australian Screen Online wrote the following in his review:
The film is a savage satire on the neuroses of the privileged of Sydney’s eastern suburbs, where White lived, and the director Jim Sharman grew up. Much of the satire verges on invective, and the film was criticised for being ponderous, pretentious and condescending. Parts of it are like that—especially some of the dialogue—but the film also has some moments where everything works.

References

External links

The Night the Prowler at Oz Movies

1978 films
Australian comedy-drama films
1970s English-language films
1978 comedy-drama films
Films directed by Jim Sharman
Works by Patrick White
1978 comedy films
1978 drama films
1970s Australian films